Carlos António Fonseca Simőes  (born 28 July 1951) is a former Portuguese footballer who played as central defender. Simões gained 13 caps for the Portugal national team.

Honours

Club
Académica
Segunda Divisão: 1972–73

Porto
Primeira Divisão: 1977–78, 1978–79
Taça de Portugal: 1976–77
Supertaça Cândido de Oliveira: 1981

External links
 
 

1951 births
Living people
Associação Académica de Coimbra – O.A.F. players
FC Porto players
Portimonense S.C. players
Portugal international footballers
Portuguese footballers
Primeira Liga players
Sportspeople from Coimbra
Association football central defenders
S.U. Sintrense managers
Portuguese football managers